Hamirpur is a Lok Sabha parliamentary constituency in Uttar Pradesh.

Assembly segments
Presently, Hamirpur Lok Sabha constituency comprises five Vidhan Sabha (legislative assembly) segments. These are:-

Members of Parliament

Election results

2019

2014

See also
 Hamirpur, Uttar Pradesh
 List of Constituencies of the Lok Sabha

Notes

References

Lok Sabha constituencies in Uttar Pradesh
Hamirpur district, Uttar Pradesh